S50 may refer to:

Automobiles 
 BMW S50, an automobile engine
 Changan Ruixing S50, a Chinese MPV
 Daihatsu New Line (S50), a Japanese pickup truck
 Forthing Jingyi S50, a Chinese sedan
 Levdeo S50, a Chinese SUV
 Prince Skyline (S50), a Japanese sedan
 Suzuki Boulevard S50 a Japanese motorcycle
 Toyota Crown (S50), a Japanese luxury car
 Weiwang S50, a Chinese SUV

Aviation 
 Auburn Municipal Airport (Washington), in King County, Washington, United States
 Blériot-SPAD S.50, a French biplane airliner
 Letov Š-50, a prototype Czechoslovak military aircraft
 SIAI S.50, an Italian biplane fighter
 Sikorsky S-50, an American helicopter

Electronics 
 Canon PowerShot S50, a digital camera
 Cat S50, a mobile phone
 Nikon Coolpix S50, a digital camera
 Pentax Optio S50, a digital camera
 Roland S-50, a sampling keyboard
 Sirius S50, a satellite radio receiver
 ThinkCentre S50, a personal computer

Naval vessels 
 , a submarine of the Royal Navy
 , a torpedo boat of the Imperial German Navy
 , a submarine of the United States Navy

Other uses 
 S-50 (Manhattan Project), a uranium enrichment effort
 S50 (RER Fribourg), a rail line in Fribourg, Switzerland
 S50 (TILO), a rail service between Ticino, Switzerland and Lombardy, Italy
 5th Ring Road, an expressway in Beijing, China
 Expressway S50 (Poland)
 S50: Do not mix with ... (to be specified by the manufacturer), a safety phrase
 Toyota S50, a Toyota S transmission